Jed Cartwright (born 24 October 1996) is an Australian professional rugby league footballer who plays as a  and  forward for the South Sydney Rabbitohs in the National Rugby League. 

He previously played for the Penrith Panthers in the National Rugby League.

Background
Cartwright was born in Sydney, Australia and is the son of former Penrith, Australian international and NSW Origin player John Cartwright, he is also the cousin of former Gold Coast Titans player and former Panther Bryce Cartwright.

He played his junior rugby league for the Warragamba Wombats.

Playing career
Cartwright made his first grade debut for Penrith against his cousin Bryce Cartwright in round 17 of the 2019 NRL season against the Gold Coast Titans which ended in a 24–2 victory at Penrith Park.
After signing for South Sydney in 2020, he made his club debut in round 18 of the 2020 NRL season against the Wests Tigers.  The following week against Canterbury-Bankstown, Cartwright appeared to have scored his first try in the top grade but he lost the ball over the try line in the second half of the match as South Sydney suffered a 26-16 shock defeat at ANZ Stadium.
In round 9 of the 2021 NRL season, Cartwright made his first start of the year for South Sydney in a 50-0 loss against Melbourne at Stadium Australia.
Cartwright was limited to only five matches for South Sydney in the 2022 NRL season.  Cartwright was called into the South Sydney side as injury cover for their preliminary final against Penrith which Souths lost 32-12.

References

External links
South Sydney Rabbitohs profile
Penrith Panthers profile

1996 births
Living people
Australian rugby league players
Penrith Panthers players
South Sydney Rabbitohs players
Rugby league centres
Rugby league players from Sydney
Rugby league second-rows